Christian Paul Stephenson (born 22 July 1974) is a British middle-distance runner. He competed in the men's 3000 metres steeplechase at the 2000 Summer Olympics.

References

External links
 

1974 births
Living people
Athletes (track and field) at the 2000 Summer Olympics
British male middle-distance runners
British male steeplechase runners
Olympic athletes of Great Britain
Place of birth missing (living people)